Trond Nymark (born 28 December 1976) is a Norwegian race walker. He was born in Bergen and represents TIF Viking.

Achievements

References

External links
 http://www.trondnymark.no/ Homepage of Trond Nymark.

1976 births
Living people
Norwegian male racewalkers
Athletes (track and field) at the 2004 Summer Olympics
Athletes (track and field) at the 2008 Summer Olympics
Athletes (track and field) at the 2012 Summer Olympics
Olympic athletes of Norway
World Athletics Championships medalists
World Athletics Championships winners
Sportspeople from Bergen
21st-century Norwegian people